= Martin Renkiewicz =

American lawyer

- Education: University of Rhode Island
- Known for: Director of the United States National Central Bureau of Interpol
- Police career
- Country: Immigration and Naturalization Service, U.S. Immigration and Customs Enforcement, Department of Homeland Security
- Allegiance: United States
- Department: Department of Homeland Security
- Status: Retired
- Other work: Director of the Americas region for Borderpol

Martin Renkiewicz, a career federal special agent, was the first Department of Homeland Security law enforcement officer to serve as Director of the United States National Central Bureau Interpol in Washington. He was appointed on July 1, 2006 by President George W. Bush and served until October 1, 2009. Interpol Washington is a component of the Department of Justice co-managed by Departments of Justice and Homeland Security. The director of the National Central Bureau serves as the U.S. attorney general’s representative and the U.S. law enforcement representative before the over 190 Interpol member countries and its headquarters in Lyon, France. Prior to his appointment he served as the Deputy Director of Interpol Washington from August 2003 through June 2006 and as Assistant Director of the Fugitive Division at the National Central Bureau from September 2001 through July 2003 where he administered the Foreign Fugitive Notice Program.

== Early life ==
Renkiewicz is a 1976 University of Rhode Island graduate.

== Early career ==
Renkiewicz began his law enforcement career with the Immigration and Naturalization Service in 1978 as a criminal investigator in Newark, New Jersey. He also served in Miami, Florida, Washington, D.C. and Baltimore, Maryland. He became a supervisory special agent, developing an extensive knowledge of immigration related law enforcement issues including border security, human trafficking, visa fraud and the detection of fraudulent identity and travel documents. He also served as first Employer and Labor Relations Officer the Immigration and Naturalization Service in Baltimore, where he was responsible for administering the employer education, compliance and sanction provisions mandated by the Immigration Reform and Control Act of 1986.

== Career at ICE ==
With the passage of the Homeland Security Act in November 2002 Renkiewicz assumed the position of supervisory special agent with Immigration and Customs Enforcement. As a representative to Interpol he represented both the National Central Bureau and Immigration and Customs Enforcement at the General Secretariat on issues including human trafficking, trafficking in fraudulent identity and travel documents, intellectual property violations, foreign fugitive investigations and international extradition procedures.

== Post government career ==
Since retirement, Renkiewicz has performed as a subject matter expert and consultant in the international law enforcement and immigration arenas. From February 2016 through January 2017 he served as the director of the Americas region for Borderpol, an Ottawa-based non-profit international organization founded to serve the border security and management community.
